Potters Mills is a hamlet in Potter Township, Centre County, Pennsylvania, United States, just east of the Potter-Allison Farm. It is named after 
General James Potter (1729–1789), who built a log cabin and grist mill there, at what is now the intersection of General Potter Highway (U.S. Route 322) and the Old Fort Road (Pennsylvania Route 144).

Demographics

Notable person
John Potter, Jr., Wisconsin legislator, was born in Potters Mills.

References

Unincorporated communities in Centre County, Pennsylvania
Unincorporated communities in Pennsylvania